Moşneni may refer to several villages in Romania:
 Moşneni, a village in 23 August Commune, Constanţa County
 Moşneni, a village in Almăj Commune, Dolj County
 Moşneni, a village in Floreşti Commune, Mehedinţi County

See also 
 Moșna (disambiguation)
 Moșteni (disambiguation)